Albizia carrii is a species of plant in the family Fabaceae. It is found only in Papua New Guinea.

References

carrii
Endemic flora of Papua New Guinea
Trees of Papua New Guinea
Taxonomy articles created by Polbot